The Council for British Research in the Levant (CBRL) is a non-profit organisation that promotes humanities and social science research in the Levant. It consists of two research institutes, the Kenyon Institute in Jerusalem and the British Institute in Amman (BIA) in Amman, Jordan.

History 
The CBRL was established in 1998 as an amalgamation of the British School of Archaeology in Jerusalem (now the Kenyon Institute) and the British Institute at Amman for Archaeology and History (now the British Institute in Amman). While its predecessors mainly existed to support archaeological research in their respective host countries, the newly formed CBRL, sponsored by the British Academy, broadened its remit to include research into the history, culture and society of the entire Levant.

Plans to open a CBRL institute in Damascus have been suspended due to the ongoing Syrian Civil War.

Publications

Levant 
Levant (ISSN 1756-3801) is an academic journal of archaeological research in the Levant, first published in 1969 by the British School of Archaeology in Jerusalem, and later by the CBRL. It is currently produced by Maney Publishing and publishes three issues per year.

Since 2004 the CBRL has also published research monographs as the "Levant Supplementary Series".

Contemporary Levant 
The CBRL launched a second journal, Contemporary Levant, in 2016, covering research on contemporary politics, society and culture in the Levant.

Bulletin of the Council for British Research in the Levant 
The CBRL also produces an annual Bulletin as its document of record, which also contains reports on research sponsored by the CBRL in the previous year aimed at a general readership. It was formerly known as the CBRL Newsletter.

Directors 
 Alison McQuitty (1998–1999)
 Bill Finlayson (1999–2018)

See also 
 British Institute at Ankara
 British Institute in Eastern Africa
 British Institute of Persian Studies
 British School at Athens
 British School at Rome
 British Institute for the Study of Iraq
 Society for Libyan Studies

References

External links 
Council for British Research in the Levant
Levant at Maney Publishing
 Yucel, I. "The British School of Archaeology in Jerusalem in the wake of the WWI." History Studies, 9/2, 2017.

British overseas research institutes
History organisations based in the United Kingdom
Ancient Near East organizations
Organizations established in 1998
1998 establishments in the United Kingdom